In mathematics, the Tamagawa number  of a semisimple algebraic group defined over a global field  is the measure of , where  is the adele ring of .

The computation of Tamagawa numbers for semisimple groups contains important parts of classical quadratic form theory.

Definition

Choose Haar measures on the completions  such that  has volume 1 for all but finitely many places .
 
The Tamagawa measure on the adelic algebraic group  is now defined as follows.

Weil's conjecture on Tamagawa numbers

See also
Adelic algebraic group
Weil's conjecture on Tamagawa numbers

References

.

Further reading 
Aravind Asok, Brent Doran and Frances Kirwan, "Yang-Mills theory and Tamagawa Numbers: the fascination of unexpected links in mathematics", February 22, 2013
J. Lurie, The Siegel Mass Formula, Tamagawa Numbers, and Nonabelian Poincaré Duality posted June 8, 2012.

Algebraic groups
Algebraic number theory